Pragadavaram is a village located in Chintalapudi Mandal of West Godavari District in the state of Andhra Pradesh, India. The nearest railway station is located at Denduluru (DEL) at a distance of 31.32 Km.

Demographics 

 Census of India, Pragadavaram had a population of 10755. The total population constitute, 5396 males and 5359 females with a sex ratio of 993 females per 1000 males. 1022 children are in the age group of 0–6 years, with sex ratio of 977 The average literacy rate stands at 63.34%.

References

Villages in West Godavari district